Arasangam is a 2008 Indian Tamil language crime thriller film directed by R. Madhesh. The film stars Vijayakanth in the lead role, making this his 150th film, along with Navaneet Kaur, Sheryl Pinto, Rahul Dev, Biju Menon, Sriman, and Riyaz Khan. Produced by L. K. Sudhish the film had soundtrack was composed by Srikanth Deva and distributed by Pyramid Saimira. Shot in India and Canada, the film released on 9 April 2008 with positive reviews from critics and become a Super Hit.

Plot
Economically and strategically important CEOs, Scientists, etc. are assassinated all over India. Since many of such murders take place in Chennai, the Home Minister of Tamil Nadu pressurizes the DGP to speed up the investigation. ATS Officer Manoj is invited to Chennai from Mumbai to help the Tamil Nadu Police Department. He mysteriously disappears during the flight.

The Police Department concludes there is a link between the assassinations and the disappearance of Manoj and hands over both the cases to criminologist and IPS Trainer Arivarasu IPS, who is also a close friend and brother-in-law of Manoj.

Arivarasu's investigation takes him to Toronto, Ontario, Canada where he meets Manoj's lookalike Martin Jayapal, who has hatched a plot to destabilize India. How Arivarasu thwarts his intentions forms the rest of the story.

Cast

Vijayakanth as Arivarasu IPS (PTC Police Training College)
Navneet Kaur as Aarthi
Sheryl Pinto as Lara
Biju Menon as Manoj Police Officer and Martin Jayapal
Ravichandran as Home Minister of Tamil Nadu (guest appearance)
Rahul Dev as Chandru
Riyaz Khan as Jaffar
Sriman as Terrorist
Deepan Chakravarthy as DGP D. Dhanasekaran
Darini
Akila as Manisha, Manoj's sister
Sathya
Anjali Devi as Valliammal
Rajendranath as Police inspector
Rail Ravi as Doctor
Pattinapakkam Jayaram as Cable TV operator
Suzane George as Insurance sales agent
Ramana Madhesh in a cameo appearance
Leena Sidhu in a special appearance

Soundtrack
Lyrics were written by Pa. Vijay and Kabilan.

Critical reception
Rediff wrote "Arasangam (Government) directed by Madhesh and starring 'Captain' Vijayakanth certainly didn't inspire wild hopes of an excellent movie. But fate has a way of throwing you off. This movie is one such pleasant surprise" and also noted "In the end though, its Madhesh's screenplay that wins, showing some signs of intelligence and hard work." Behindwoods wrote "With a script that provides enough fodder for a typical Vijayakanth movie, Director Madhesh has done his best to present it with credibility. His attempts succeed in the first half and lose steam in the latter."

References

2008 films
Films shot in Toronto
Royal Canadian Mounted Police in fiction
2000s Tamil-language films
Films set in Toronto
Films scored by Srikanth Deva
Fictional portrayals of the Tamil Nadu Police
Central Bureau of Investigation in fiction
2008 crime thriller films